Spanish Filipino (Filipino/;) is any citizen or resident of the Philippines who is of Spanish or Latin American ancestry. Many trace their ancestry to early settlers from Spain and  Mexico who settled in the Philippines during the Spanish Crown’s ownership of the  territory which was ruled through Mexico City, and later, Madrid.

The conquistador Miguel López de Legazpi sailed from Mexico, conquered parts of the islands, and founded the first Spanish settlement in Cebu in 1565. Later he established Manila as the capital of the Spanish East Indies in 1571. The Philippine Islands were named after King Philip II of Spain and it became a territory of the Viceroyalty of New Spain which was governed from Mexico City until the 19th century, when the First Mexican Empire obtained independence. From 1821, the Philippine Islands were ruled directly from Madrid, Spain.

Spaniards are referred to by Filipinos as "Kastila" (Castilian), in the Malay fashion, from the Portuguese name for the former Kingdom of Castile, now a region of Spain.

They are also referred to as "Spanish Filipino", "Español Filipino" and "Hispano Filipino". They are also referred to colloquially as Tisoy, derived from the Spanish word mestizo.

Background

A Spanish Filipino is any citizen or resident of the Philippines who is of Spanish or Latin American  descent. They are represented in all levels of Philippine society and are integrated politically and economically, in the private and government sector.

Spanish Filipinos are present within several commerce and business sectors in the Philippines and a few sources estimate companies which comprise a significant portion of the Philippine economy are owned by Spanish Filipinos like  International Container Terminal Services Inc., Manila Water, Integrated Micro-Electronics, Inc., Ayala Land,  Ynchausti y Compañia, Ayala Corporation, Aboitiz & Company, Union Bank of the Philippines, ANSCOR, Bank of the Philippine Islands, Globe Telecom, Solaire Resort & Casino, to name but a few.

Demographics

Definition 
Though the definition of the term Hispanic may vary, it generally refers to people, cultures, or countries related to Spain, the Spanish language, or Hispanidad. It is commonly applied to countries once part of the Spanish Empire, particularly the countries of Latin America, Equatorial Guinea, and Spanish Sahara. The Spanish culture and Spanish language are the main traditions.

The Philippines is no longer a Spanish-speaking country, the Tydings–McDuffie Act having laid the groundwork in 1934 for public education to be conducted n English. However, Filipinos retain many Hispanic influences because of three centuries of Spanish colonization, including being part of the New Spain and later Spain itself.

Spanish Philippines 
Between 1565 and 1898, Hispanics from Latin America and Spain sailed to and from the Philippine Islands. This contributed to the assimilation of Hispanics into everyday society. According to an 1818 study by the renowned German ethnologist Fëdor Jagor entitled The Former Philippines thru Foreign Eyes, not less than one third of the inhabitants of the island of Luzon were descendants of Spaniards, mixed with varying degrees of South American, Chinese, and Indian ancestry and the vast majority of military personnel then had Latin-American origins.

History

Spanish Philippines is the history of the Philippines from 1521 to 1898. It begins with the arrival in 1521 of European explorer Ferdinand Magellan sailing for Spain, which heralded the period when the Philippines was an overseas province of Spain, and ends with the outbreak of the Spanish–American War in 1898.

The Spanish conquest of 1565, prompted the colonization of the Philippine Islands that lasted for 333 years. The Philippines was a former territory of the Viceroyalty of New Spain until the grant of independence to Mexico in 1821 necessitated the direct government from Spain of the Philippines from that year. Early Spanish settlers were mostly explorers, soldiers, government officials, religious missionaries, and among others, who were born in Spain and Mexico called Peninsulares (Spanish migrants living in the colony) or Criollo (Spaniards of pure blood), who settled in the islands with their families to governed the colony, and the majority of the indigenous population. Some of these individuals married or inter-bred with the indigenous Filipino (Austronesian/Malay/Malayo-Polynesian) population while most married only other Spaniards. Their succeeding generation called Insulares (Spaniards or Hispanics born from the islands), became town local officers, and were granted with haciendas (plantation estates) by the Spanish government. In some provinces like, Vigan, Iloilo, Cebu, Pampanga, and Zamboanga, The Spanish government encouraged foreign merchants to trade with the indigenous population, but they were not given certain privileges such as ownership of land. From this contact, social intercourse between foreign merchants, and indigenous people resulted in a new ethnic group. These group were called Mestizos (mixed-race individuals), who were born from intermarriages of the Spaniards and merchants with the indigenous Filipino (Austronesian/Malay/Malayo-Polynesian) natives. Some of their descendants, emerged later as an influential part of the ruling class, such as the Principalía (Nobility).

The Spanish implemented incentives to deliberately entangle the various races together in order to stop rebellion: - It is needful to encourage public instruction in all ways possible, permit newspapers subject to a liberal censure, to establish in Manila a college of medicine, surgery, and pharmacy: in order to break down the barriers that divide the races, and amalgamate them all into one. For that purpose, the Spaniards of the country, the Chinese mestizos, and the Filipinos shall be admitted with perfect equality as cadets of the military corps; the personal-service tax shall be abolished, or an equal and general tax shall be imposed, to which all the Spaniards shall be subject. This last plan appears to me more advisable, as the poll-tax is already established, and it is not opportune to make a trial of new taxes when it is a question of allowing the country to be governed by itself. Since the annual tribute is unequal, the average shall be taken and shall be fixed, consequently, at fifteen or sixteen reals per whole tribute, or perhaps one peso fuerte annually from each adult tributary person. This regulation will produce an increase in the revenue of 200,000 or 300,000 pesos fuertes, and this sum shall be set aside to give the impulse for the amalgamation of the races, favoring crossed marriages by means of dowries granted to the single women in the following manner. To a Chinese mestizo woman who marries a Filipino shall be given 100 pesos; to a Filipino woman who marries a Chinese mestizo, 100 pesos; to a Chinese mestizo woman who marries a Spaniard, 1,000 pesos; to a Spanish woman who marries a Chinese mestizo, 2,000 pesos; to a Filipino woman who marries a Spaniard, 2,000 pesos; to a Spanish woman who marries a Filipino chief, 3,000 or 4,000 pesos. Some mestizo and Filipino alcaldes-mayor of the provinces shall be appointed. It shall be ordered that when a Filipino chief goes to the house of a Spaniard, he shall seat himself as the latter's equal. In a word, by these and other means, the idea that they and the Castilians are two kinds of distinct races shall be erased from the minds of the natives, and the families shall become related by marriage in such manner that when free of the Castilian dominion should any exalted Filipinos try to expel or enslave our race, they would find it so interlaced with their own that their plan would be practically impossible.

Mexicans of European or Mestizo heritage known as Americanos (Americans) also arrived in the Philippines during the Spanish colonial period. Between 1565 and 1815, Hispanics from Mexico and Spain sailed to, and from the Philippines as government officials, soldiers, priests, settlers, traders, sailors, and adventurers in the Manila-Acapulco Galleon, assisting Spain in its trade between Latin America and the Philippine Islands.

The Philippine Statistics Department does not account for the racial background or ancestry of an individual. The official population of all types of Filipino mestizos that reside inside and outside of the Philippines remains unknown.

Spanish East Indies

The Spanish East Indies were the Spanish territories in Asia-Pacific from 1565 until 1899. They comprised the Philippine Islands, Guam and the Mariana Islands, the Caroline Islands (Palau and the Federated States of Micronesia), and for some time parts of Formosa (Taiwan) and the Moluccas (Indonesia). Cebu was the first seat of government, later transferred to Manila. From 1565 to 1821 these territories, together with the Spanish West Indies, were administered through the Viceroyalty of New Spain based in Mexico City.

Captaincy General of the Philippines

The Captaincy General of the Philippines was an administrative district of the Spanish Empire.  The Captaincy General encompassed  the Spanish East Indies which included the modern country of the Philippines and various Pacific Island possessions, such as the Caroline Islands and Guam.  It was founded in 1565 with the first permanent Spanish settlements.

For centuries all the political and economic aspects of the Captaincy were administered  in Mexico by the Viceroyalty of New Spain, while the administrative issues had to be consulted with the Spanish Crown or the Council of the Indies through the Royal Audience of Manila. However, in 1821, after Mexico became an independent nation, all control was transferred to Madrid.

Language

In Asia, the Philippines, a former Spanish overseas province, was the only Spanish-speaking sovereign nation. Spanish was the lingua franca of the country from the beginning of Spanish rule in the late 1500s until the first half of the 20th century. It held official status for nearly half a millennium before being demoted as an optional language in 1987. However, Spanish still remained a very important language up until the mid-20th century, with a gradual decline over the decades. As of 2010, some groups have rallied to revive the language and make it a compulsory subject in schools. Development of demand for Spanish speakers within the Call Center and Business Process Outsourcing industries led to its reinvigoration. Classes in the Instituto Cervantes are often full because of this.

Most Filipinos of Spanish descent are considered to belong to regional ethnic groups in the Philippines because they speak their respective regional languages. They also use English in the public sphere, and may also speak Tagalog and other Philippine languages. Spanish was, along with English, the co-official language in the Philippines from the Spanish Colonial Period until 1987 when its official status was removed.

Only a minority of Spanish descended Filipinos speak Spanish; Some Filipinos of Spanish descent, particularly those of older generations and recent immigrants, have preserved Spanish as a spoken language. In addition, Chavacano (a criollo language based largely on Spanish vocabulary) is spoken in the southern Philippines, and forms one of the majority languages of Zamboanga del Sur, Zamboanga del Norte, Zamboanga Sibugay, Basilan and is mostly concentrated in Zamboanga City. It may also be spoken in some parts of the northern Philippines.

Due to a decree by the Spanish government in 1849 to establish a census, Filipinos (of Indigenous descent) may have Spanish or Spanish-sounding surnames; The government distributed a book of surnames for the use of all Filipinos.

Philippine Spanish

Philippine Spanish is a Spanish dialect and variant of the Spanish language spoken in the Philippines. Philippine Spanish is very similar to Mexican Spanish due to Mexican and Hispanic American emigration to the Spanish East Indies (Philippines) during the Galleon trade. It is spoken mostly among Spanish Filipinos; however, its speakers have declined in numbers over the past few decades.

Socioeconomic status

Filipinos of Spanish descent currently constitute much of the upper and middle classes. Many are either in politics or are high-ranking executives of commerce and industry, entertainment and sporting ranks. A number of elite Filipino family dynasties, political families and the elite clans are of Spanish origin.

Recent immigration

According to a recent survey, the number of Spanish citizens in the Philippines regardless of ethnolinguistic affiliation was about 6,300 of the Philippine population with the vast majority of them being actually Spaniard-Filipinos, but excluding Philippine citizens of Spanish descent.

Background

During the Spanish Colonial Period, large numbers of Spaniards settled in the Americas, which resulted in widespread miscegenation between them, indigenous women and enslaved African women. The Spanish authorities developed and established a highly complex caste system based on a racial hierarchy of Spanish descent, which later became associated with whiteness. The racial doctrine used after the end of the Reconquista, called limpieza de sangre, or cleanliness of blood, was applied to the caste system.  It described and classified a person based on their purity of Spanish "blood" or heritage. Some of the castes defined were as follows:

Only in the Americas, however, were mixed-race persons of Spanish ancestry with less than one-eighth indio, or Amerindian, blood considered legally classified as criollo or white.

Colonial caste system

The history of racial mixture in the Philippines occurred mostly during the Spanish colonial period from the 16th to 19th century.

The indigenous Filipino population of the Philippines were referred to as Indios.

Persons classified as 'Blanco' (white) were the Filipino (person born in the Philippines of pure Spanish descent), peninsulares (persons born in Spain of pure Spanish descent), mestizos de español, and tornatras. Manila was racially segregated, with 'blancos' living in the walled city Intramuros, un-Christianized sangleys in Parían, Christianized sangleys and mestizos de sangley in Binondo, and the rest of the 7,000 islands for the indios, with the exception of Cebu and several other Spanish territories. 
Indio was a general term applied to native Malay or Malayan, a Malayo-Polynesian speaking people known as the Austronesian inhabitants of the Philippine archipelago, but as a legal classification, it was only applied to Christianized Malayo-Polynesian who lived in proximity to the Spanish colonies.

Persons who lived outside of Manila, Cebu, and the major Spanish posts were classified as such: 'Naturales' were Christianized Austronesian/Malay/Malayo-Polynesian of the lowland and coastal towns. The un-Christianized Aetas and Austronesian/Malay/Malayo-Polynesian who lived in the towns were classified as 'salvajes' (savages) or 'infieles' (the unfaithful). 'Remontados' (Spanish for 'situated in the mountains') and 'tulisanes' (bandits) were Austronesian/Malay/Malayo-Polynesian and Aetas who refused to live in towns and took to the hills, all of whom were considered to live outside the social order as Catholicism was a driving force in everyday life, as well as determining social class in the colony.

Persons of pure Spanish descent, as well as many mestizos and castizos, living in the Philippines who were born in Spanish America were classified as 'Americano'. A few mulattos born in Spanish America living in the Philippines kept their legal classification as such, and sometimes came as indentured servants to the 'americanos'. The Philippine-born children of 'americanos' were classified as 'Filipinos'. The Philippine-born children mulattos from Spanish America were classified based on patrilineal descent.

The Spanish legally classified the Aetas as 'negritos' based on their appearance. The word 'negrito' would be misinterpreted and used by future European scholars as an ethnoracial term in and of itself. Both Christianized Aetas who lived in the colony and un-Christianized Aetas who lived in tribes outside of the colony were classified as 'negritos'. Christianized Aetas who lived in Manila were not allowed to enter Intramuros and lived in areas designated for Indios.

Persons of mixed Aeta and Austronesian/Malay/Malayo-Polynesian ancestry were classified based on patrilineal descent; the father's ancestry determined a child's legal classification. If the father was 'negrito' (Aeta) and the mother was 'india' (Austronesian/Malayo-Polynesian), the child was classified as 'negrito'. If the father was 'indio' and the mother was 'negrita', the child was classified as 'indio'. Persons of Aeta descent were viewed as being outside of the social order as they usually lived in tribes outside of the colony and resisted conversion to Christianity.

This legal system of racial classification based on patrilineal descent had no parallel anywhere in the Spanish colonies in the Americas. In general, a son born of a sangley male and an indio or mestizo de sangley female was classified as mestizo de sangley; all subsequent male descendants were mestizos de sangley regardless of whether they married an india or a mestiza de sangley.

The social stratification system based on class that continues to this day in the Philippines has its beginnings in the Spanish colonial area with this caste system.

The system was used for tax purposes. Indios paid a base tax, mestizos de sangley paid twice the base tax, sangleys paid four times the base tax, and the blancos or whites ('filipinos' or peninsulares) paid no tax. Negritos who lived within the colony paid the same tax rate as the indios.

The Spanish colonial caste system based on race was abolished after the Philippines' independence from Spain in 1898, and the word 'Filipino' expanded to include the entire population of the Philippines regardless of racial ancestry.

Chavacano

Chavacano or Chabacano  is a Spanish-based creole language spoken in the Philippines. The word  is derived from Spanish, meaning "poor taste", "vulgar", for the Chavacano language, developed in Cavite City, Ternate, Zamboanga and Ermita. It is also derived from the word chavano, coined by the Zamboangueño people.

Six different dialects have developed: Zamboangueño in Zamboanga City, Davaoeño Zamboangueño / Castellano Abakay in Davao City, Ternateño in Ternate, Cavite, Caviteño in Cavite City, Cotabateño in Cotabato City and Ermiteño in Ermita.

Chavacano is the only Spanish-based creole in Asia. It has survived for more than 400 years, making it one of the oldest creole languages in the world. Among Philippine languages, it is the only one not an Austronesian language, but like Malayo-Polynesian languages, it uses reduplication.

Literature

Philippine literature in Spanish is a body of literature made by Filipino writers in the Spanish language. Today, this corpus is the third largest in the whole corpus of Philippine literature (Philippine literature in Filipino being the first, followed by Philippine literature in English). It is slightly larger than Philippine literature in vernacular languages. However, because of the very few additions to it in the past 30 years, it is expected that the latter will soon overtake its rank.

A list of some famous Philippine literature in Spanish follows:

Doctrina Christiana 

The Doctrina Christiana was an early book of Roman Catholic Catechism, written in 1593 by Fray Juan de Plasencia, and is believed to be one of the earliest books printed in the Philippines.

Noli Me Tángere

Noli Me Tángere (Latin for "Touch me not") is a fictional novel written by José Rizal, one of the national heroes of the Philippines, during the colonization of the country by Spain to expose the inequities of the Spanish Catholic priests and the ruling government.

Originally written in Spanish, the book is more commonly published and read in the Philippines in either Filipino or English. Together with its sequel, El Filibusterismo, the reading of Noli is obligatory for high school students throughout the country.

El Filibusterismo

El Filibusterismo (lit. Spanish for "The filibustering"), also known by its English alternative title The Reign of Greed, is the second novel written by Philippine national hero José Rizal. It is the sequel to Noli me tangere and, like the first book, was written in Spanish. It was first published in 1891 in Ghent.

The novel's dark theme departs dramatically from the previous novel's hopeful and romantic atmosphere, signifying the character Ibarra's resort to solving his country's issues through violent means, after his previous attempt at reforming the country's system have made no effect and seemed impossible with the attitudes of the Spaniards towards the Filipinos. The novel, along with its predecessor, was banned in some parts of the Philippines as a result of their portrayals of the Spanish government's abuse and corruption. These novels, along with Rizal's involvement in organizations that aim to address and reform the Spanish system and its issues, led to Rizal's exile to Dapitan and eventual execution. Both the novel and its predecessor, along with Rizal's last poem, are now considered Rizal's literary masterpieces.

Mi último adiós 

"Mi último adiós" (English; "My last farewell") is a poem originally written in Spanish by Philippine national hero Dr. José Rizal on the eve of his execution by firing squad on December 30, 1896. The piece was one of the last notes he wrote before his death; another that he had written was found in his shoe but because the text was illegible, its contents today remain a mystery.

Notable Spanish Filipinos

See also
Latin Union
Hispanic
List of hispanophones
Flag of the Hispanic People
Hispanosphere
Panhispanism
Patria Grande
Manila galleon
Mexican settlement in the Philippines
Filipino mestizo
Spanish people of Filipino ancestry
Philippines–Spain relations

References

Spanish Philippines
Hispanic and Latino
 
European diaspora in the Philippines
Filipino